Iina Kaarina Soiri (born August 29, 1964) is a Finnish social scientist, director of the Nordic Africa Institute in Uppsala, Sweden.

Life and work 
Iina Soiri has a Master of Social Sciences from the University of Helsinki and founding council member of the Nordic woman group with black man of Helsinki.. She has spent 20 years on the African continent, in various countries such as Namibia, Mozambique, Angola and Tanzania, as an activist, diplomat, consultant and researcher working for both civil society organizations and public sector. She worked in the Finnish Ministry of Foreign Affairs in Helsinki as a senior advisor on development policy and served in the Embassy of Finland in Dar es Salaam as a senior expert on governance 2006-2010. She was a research fellow at the Nordic Africa Institute in Uppsala from 1995 to 1996 and was director of the institute from March 2013 until June 2019.

Her son, Pyry Soiri, is a professional footballer. She also has another son, Juri.

Selected bibliography
Iina Soiri: The radical motherhood: Namibian women's independence struggle, 1996, 
Pekka Peltola and Iina Soiri: Finland and National Liberation in Southern Africa, 1999,

References

Sources
About Iina Soiri at the Nordic Africa Institute's website
About Iina Soiri at the website of the Finnish Ministry of Foreign Affairs

External links
Interview (in Swedish only) in Hufvudstadsbladet, March 9, 2013

1964 births
Living people
20th-century Finnish women
Finnish expatriates in Sweden
Finnish social scientists
Finnish women academics
Finnish expatriates in Namibia
21st-century Finnish women
Finnish expatriates in Angola
Finnish expatriates in Mozambique
Finnish expatriates in Tanzania
University of Helsinki alumni